Stan Getz at Large is an album by saxophonist Stan Getz which was released on the Verve label as a 2LP set in 1960
Since both albums ran slightly over 40 minutes a exact 2CD replica with the shown cover art was created without bonus tracks, which were added to a later edition.

Reception
The Allmusic review by Scott Yanow stated: "The cool-toned tenor swings as hard as usual and the music is quite pleasing".

Track listing
                LP CD 1
 "Night and Day" (Cole Porter) - 10:29 	
 "Pammie's Tune" (Stan Getz) - 7:05 	
 "Amour" (Al Cohn) - 5:45 	
 "I Like to Recognize the Tune" (Richard Rodgers, Lorenz Hart) - 6:38
 "When the Sun Comes Out" (Harold Arlen, Ted Koehler) - 6:38
 "Just a Child" (Johnny Mandel) - 3:53 	
 "The Folks Who Live on the Hill" (Jerome Kern, Oscar Hammerstein II) - 4:16
                 LP CD 2
 "Cafe Montmartre Blues" (Stan Getz) - 7:59 	
 "He Was Too Good to Me (Rodgers, Hart) - 4:29 	
 "Younger Than Springtime" (Rodgers, Hammerstein) - 5:06 	
 "Goodbye" (Gordon Jenkins) - 3:36 	
 "Land's End" (Harold Land) - 7:00 	
 "In Your Own Sweet Way" (Dave Brubek) - 6:01 	
 "In the Night" (Traditional) - 5:25
 
                Bonus tracks on a later CD edition
 "Born to Be Blue" (Mel Tormé, Robert Wells) - 4:56 Bonus track on CD reissue
 "The Thrill Is Gone" (Ray Henderson, Lew Brown) - 6:36 Bonus track on CD reissue 
 "A New Town Is a Blue Town" (Richard Adler, Jerry Ross) - 5:11 Bonus track on CD reissue

Personnel 
Stan Getz - tenor saxophone
Jan Johansson - piano
Daniel Jordan - bass
William Schiopffe - drums

References 

1960 live albums
Stan Getz live albums
Verve Records live albums